The Moldova national under-19 football team represents Moldova in international football at this age level and is controlled by the Moldovan Football Federation, the governing body for football in Moldova. The team competes to qualify for the UEFA European Under-19 Championship held every year. Since the establishment of the Moldovan under-19 team, the under-19 side has never reached a final tournament of the UEFA European Under-19 Championship. Players born on or after 1 January 2005 are eligible for the 2024 UEFA European Under-19 Championship qualification. They are currently coached by Alexandru Guzun.

Competition history

UEFA U-18/19 European Championship
Under-18 era, 1995–2001Under-19 era, 2002– present

2024 UEFA European Under-19 Championship

Qualifying round

2023 UEFA European Under-19 Championship

Qualifying round

All-time record
Only competitive matches are included.

See also
 Moldova men's national football team
 Moldova men's national under-21 football team
 Moldova men's national under-17 football team
 Moldova women's national football team
 Moldova women's national under-19 football team
 Moldova women's national under-17 football team

References

External links
 Moldova U-19 at uefa.com
 Moldova U-19 at soccerway

European national under-19 association football teams
under